The 2015 Copa de la Reina de Fútbol was the 33rd edition of the Spanish women's football national cup. It ran from 10 to 17 May 2015 and it was contested by the best eight teams in the 2014–15 Spanish Championship. Both the quarterfinals were  single-elimination in Las Rozas and Torrelodones, while the semifinals and final was held in Melilla.

Qualification

The top eight positions of the 2014–15 Spanish First Division qualified for the cup.

Qualified teams by community

Results

Bracket

Quarterfinals

Semifinals

Final

Goalscorers
4 goals:
  Cristina Martín-Prieto (Sporting de Huelva)

2 goals:
 Carolina Férez (Valencia)
 Esther González (Atlético de Madrid)

1 goal:

References

Women
Copa de la Reina
Copa de la Reina de Fútbol seasons